Dasypeltis is a genus of colubrid snakes. It is one of only two taxonomic groups of snakes known to have adapted to feed exclusively on eggs (the other being the genus Elachistodon). Dasypeltis are non-venomous and found throughout the continent of Africa, primarily in forested or wooded habitats that are also home to numerous species of birds.

Species and subspecies
Dasypeltis has 17 recognized species, two of which have recognized subspecies:

Dasypeltis abyssina 
Dasypeltis arabica  - Arabian egg-eating snake
Dasypeltis atra  - montane egg-eating snake
Dasypeltis bazi 
Dasypeltis confusa 
Dasypeltis congolensis 
Dasypeltis crucifera  - cross-marked egg-eating snake
Dasypeltis fasciata  - Central African egg eating snake
Dasypeltis gansi 
Dasypeltis inornata  - southern brown egg-eating snake
Dasypeltis latericia 
Dasypeltis medici  - East African egg-eating snake
 Dasypeltis medici lamuensis 
 Dasypeltis medici medici 
Dasypeltis palmarum 
Dasypeltis parascabra 
Dasypeltis sahelensis  
Dasypeltis scabra  - common or rhombic egg-eating snake
Dasypeltis scabra loveridgei 
Dasypeltis scabra scabra 
Dasypeltis taylori  

Nota bene: A binomial authority in parentheses indicates that the species was originally described in a genus other than Dasypeltis.

Etymology
The specific name, gansi, is in honor of American herpetologist Carl Gans (1923–2009).

Description
The species of the genus Dasypeltis exhibit a wide variation in patterning and color, from mixtures of browns and greens, to solid black. Individuals in a specific locality tend to share similar color and pattern.

Behavior
Dasypeltis species tend to have a nervous disposition, and when threatened will perform what is called saw-scaling, where it will rub its scales together quickly to make a rasping noise that sounds vaguely like hissing. They are agile climbers, and have a keen sense of smell to tell whether an egg is rotten or too far developed to be comfortable to eat. They have extremely flexible jaws and necks for eating eggs much larger than their head, and have no teeth, but they do have bony protrusions on the inside edge of their spine which are used to aid in breaking the shells of eggs.

The process of consuming an egg involves wrapping their mouth around it and drawing it into the throat and then flexing their muscles pushing the egg into the bony protrusions on their spine, which causes the egg to collapse in on itself. Then the snake carefully squeezes every last bit of liquid out of the inside of the egg, ending with regurgitation of the completely crushed egg shell. They are remarkably efficient, and waste very little of the contents of an egg.

Gallery
A sequence of a montane egg-eating snake, Dasypeltis atra, consuming a quail egg: grasping egg, swallowing egg, breaking egg and ingesting contents, regurgitating shell.

In captivity
Dasypeltis species are readily available in the exotic pet trade, but due to their unique dietary needs they can be a challenge to keep in captivity. Most egg-eating snakes never get large enough to consume typical chicken eggs, so smaller ones must be provided, such as finch or quail eggs. Once a reliable source(s) of food is obtained, Dasypeltis make easy and hardy vivarium species. Captive breeding is virtually unknown, so almost all specimens available are wild caught.

Many owners have resorted to force-feeding their Dasypeltis because the animal seems not to be eating. However, evidence has shown that, like large constrictors, these snakes may go for very long periods (months) without eating after a large meal. As long as the snake is behaving normally and does not appear to be in physical distress, force-feeding is not advised. When a specimen seems to be "off" its food, offering it eggs approximately monthly is appropriate. If the snake does not eat but continues to drink, is active, and sheds, then it does not need to be force-fed.

References

Further reading
Boulenger GA (1894). Catalogue of the Snakes in the British Museum (Natural History). Volume II., Containing the Conclusion of the Colubridæ Aglyphæ. London: Trustees of the British Museum (Natural History). (Taylor and Francis, printers). xi + 382 pp. + Plates I-XX. (Genus Dasypeltis, pp. 353–354, Figure 25, three views of skull).
Branch, Bill (2004). Field Guide to Snakes and other Reptiles of Southern Africa. Third Revised edition, Second impression. Sanibel Island, Florida: Ralph Curtis Books. 399 pp. (Genus Dasypeltis, p. 95).
Goin CJ, Goin OB, Zug GR (1978). Introduction to Herpetology, Third Edition. San Francisco: W.H. Freeman and Company. xi + 378 pp. . (Genus Dasypeltis, p. 328).
Wagler J (1830). Natürliches System der AMPHIBIEN, mit vorangehender Classification der SÄUGTHIERE und VÖGEL. Ein Beitrag zur vergleichenden Zoologie. Munich, Stuttgart and Tübingen: J.G. Cotta. vi + 354 pp. + one plate. (Dasypeltis, new genus, p. 178). (in German and Latin).

External links

Herper.com Keeping Egg-eating Snakes
All about Dasypeltis / Egg-Eater - English / German
Status and distribution of D. sahelensis in Northern Africa
Dasypeltis at Life is Short, but Snakes are Long

Colubrids
Taxa named by Andrew Smith (zoologist)
Snake genera